Ziad Antar (born 1978 in Saida, Lebanon) is a Lebanese filmmaker and photographer. He studied Agricultural Engineering at the American University of Beirut before turning to video and arts with a residency at the Palais de Tokyo in Paris and a post-diploma of the École nationale supérieure des Beaux-Arts, Paris,

Life and work
Ziad Antar’s short films evoke a world in conflict through a playful tone. In the aftermath of the 2006 Lebanon War, Ziad Antar produced a short film entitled La Marche Turque. The image shows the hands of a pianist playing Mozart’s partition, while the sound is hammered, reminding the one of bombings. In 2002, Antar had directed a documentary film devoted to his mentor, the photographer Jean-Luc Moulène.

In 2000, he acquired a 1948 Kodak Reflex and 10 rolls of black-and-white film that had expired in 1976. He began using this outdated material, producing a blurred and almost abstract effect on his photographs. One of the photographs depict Walid Jumblatt and supposedly evokes the danger the Lebanese Druze leader faces after having criticized Hezbollah and the Syrian government.

Filmography
 Jean-Luc Moulène (2002)
 Tokyo Tonight (2003)
 WA (2004)
 La Marche Turque (2006)
 Safe Sound (2006)
 Mdardara (2007)
 La Corde (2007)
 Le Radar (2007)
 Etudes Mains (2008)
 La Mouche (2008)
 Banana (2008)
 Night of Love (2009)
 La Souris (2009)
 Safe Sound (2009)

Publications
Beirut Bereft – The Architecture of the Forsaken and Map of the Derelict (Rasha Salti & Ziad Antar), Sharjah Art Foundation, 2009
Portrait of a territory, Actes Sud/Sharjah Art Foundation, 2012
Expired, Beaux Arts de Paris Editions and Musée Nicéphore Niepce publication, 2014
After Images, Contributions by Hans Ulrich Obrist, Yahya Amqassim, Manal Khader, Yasmina Jraissa, Kaph 2016

Selected exhibitions

Solo exhibitions
Dark Matter, La Crypte, Beirut in Collaboration with Beirut Art Residency 2017
Ziad Antar: Safe Sounds II in Collaboration with Beirut Art Residency 2016 
After Images, Beirut Exhibition Center 2016
Ziad Antar: Expired, Selma Feriani Gallery, London, 2011
Portrait of a Territory, Arts Area, Sharjah, 2012

Group exhibitions
Home Works IV, Galerie Sfeir Semler, Beirut, 2008
2008 TaipeiBiennial, Taipei, 2008
Lebanon Now, Darat al Funun, Amman, 2008
Provisions for the Future: Past of the Coming Days, Sharjah Biennial 09, Sharjah, 2009
America, Beirut Art Center, Beirut, 2009
21 Shortlisted Artists of the Future Generation Art Prize Group Exhibition, Pinchkuk Art Centre, Kiev, 2010
The Future of a Promise, 54th Venice Biennale, 2011
The Mediterranean Approach, Palazzo Zenobio, Venice, 2011
Art is the answer! Contemporary Lebanese artists and designers, Villa Empain, Brussels, 2012
 Across Boundaries. Focus on Lebanese Photography, curated by Tarek Nahas, Beirut Art Fair 2018

References

External links
  Ziad Antar at Centre Pompidou, Paris
 Ziad Antar at Video Data Bank

Lebanese photographers
Lebanese filmmakers
1978 births
Living people
Lebanese contemporary artists